The Women's keirin was held on 19 October 2014.

Results

First round
Top two in each heat qualified directly for the second round; the remainder went to the first round repechage.

Heat 1

Heat 3

Heat 2

Heat 4

First round Repechage
Heat winners qualified for the second round.

Heat 1

Heat 3

Heat 2

Heat 4

Second round
First three riders in each semi qualified for the final; the remainder went to the small final (for places 7-12).

Semi-final 1

Semi-final 2

Finals
The final classification is determined in the ranking finals.

Final (places 7-12)

Final (places 1-6)

References

Women's keirin
European Track Championships – Women's keirin